Reggae With The Hippy Boys is an album by The Hippy Boys, released in 1969.  Originally Issued by Trojan records, the album was classified in the style of Skinhead Reggae and ska. The Original LP has long become a highly sought-after collectors item.

Track listing
"Nurse J'kel"
"This Is It"
"Mad Movie"
"Capo"
"Footwork"
"Seven Heaven"
"Moon Walk"
"Challenge"
"Spicy"
"Wondering"

References

The Hippy Boys albums
1969 albums